The Australian Theatre Festival was a series of adaptations of Australian plays filmed by the ABC in 1979-80. Six plays were filmed in all at an estimated budget of $5,000 an episode. They aired on Sunday night opposite movies on the commercial channels. They were partly inspired by a government ruling that the ABC could keep any money it made selling projects overseas.

The series was not a ratings success.

Episodes
First Series:
Carolie Lansdowne Says No by Alex Buzo
A Toast to Melba by Jack Hibberd
Big Toys by Patrick White
Departmental by Mervyn Rutherford
The Department by David Williamson
Bedfellows by Barry Oakley
Second Series:
A Hard God by Peter Kenna

References

Australian Broadcasting Corporation original programming